Paranephrops planifrons is a species of southern crawfish in the family Parastacidae. It is found in New Zealand. P. planifrons is one of two indigenous species of freshwater crayfish found in New Zealand. They are more commonly found in the North Island and the West Coast of the South Island while the P. zealandicus is found in the east and south of the South Island. Both species of Paranephrops are important resources to the indigenous Māori, particularly in the Te Arawa and Lake Taupō regions.

The International Union for Conservation of Nature's conservation status of P. planifrons is "LC", least concern, with no immediate threat to the species' survival.

References

Further reading

 
 

Parastacidae
Articles created by Qbugbot
Crustaceans described in 1842
Freshwater crustaceans of New Zealand
Endemic fauna of New Zealand
Taxa named by Adam White (zoologist)
Endemic crustaceans of New Zealand